Samuel Inkoom (born 1 June 1989) is a Ghanaian professional footballer who plays as a defender for Accra Hearts of Oak S.C. Between 2008 and 2014 he made 44 appearances scoring 1 goal for the Ghana national team. He has played in teams based in 9 different countries, namely Switzerland, Ukraine, France, Greece, United States of America, Portugal, Turkey, Bulgaria and latest in Georgia.

Club career
Inkoom began his career with Sekondi Hasaacas in his native Ghana.  He later moved to Asante Kotoko SC in Ghana.

On 26 April 2009, it was announced that Inkoom moved for an undisclosed fee from Asante Kotoko to FC Basel in the Swiss Super League on a three-year contract. He joined Basel's first team during their 2009–10 season under head coach Thorsten Fink. After playing in three test games, Inkoom played his domestic league debut for the club in the away game in the Kybunpark on 12 July 2009 as Basel were defeated 0–2 by St. Gallen. At the end of the 2009–10 season he won the Double with his club. They won the League Championship title with 3 points advantage over second placed Young Boys. The team won the Swiss Cup, winning the final 6–0 against Lausanne-Sport.

Inkoom scored his first league goal for Basel on 25 September 2010 in the away game in the Letzigrund as his team won 4–1 against rivals Zürich. In the 2010–11 Champions League group stage away game on 19 October 2010 Inkoom scored a goal for his team as Basel won 3–1 against Roma. On 24 January 2011 left the club. During his 18 months with the club, Inkoom played a total of 74 games for Basel scoring just those two goals. 42 of these games were in the Swiss Super League, three in the Swiss Cup, 19 in the UEFA competitions (Champions League and Europa League) and nine were friendly games.

Inkoom moved to FC Dnipro Dnipropetrovsk of the Ukrainian Premier League. On 30 October 2011, in a league game against FC Karpaty Lviv, Inkoom received a yellow card for taking his shirt off while leaving the pitch to be substituted by Yevhen Shakhov. This was Inkoom's second yellow card of the game and he received a red card and Shakhov could not come on. His side were able to hold out for the 2–0 away win though.

In February 2013 Inkoom moved to Bastia of the French Ligue 1 for the rest of the 2013–14 season. The following season Inkoom again moved on six-month loan, this time to Greek side Platanias in January 2014.

In September 2014, Inkoom signed with D.C. United of Major League Soccer on a free transfer. Personal terms were not disclosed.

On 8 December 2014, Inkoom was traded to Houston Dynamo along with Joe Willis, in exchange for Andrew Driver and a fourth-round 2016 MLS SuperDraft pick. However, he did not sign with the club.

On 11 June 2015, Inkoom joined Boavista of the Portuguese Primeira Liga on a three-year-deal.

On 6 January 2016, Inkoom signed a contract with Turkish-side Antalyaspor.

On 24 February 2017, Inkoom joined Bulgarian club FC Vereya. He made his debut for the team in match against Ludogorets Razgrad for the Bulgarian First League on 26 February 2017.  He left the team in June when his contract expired. On 23 June 2017, the Bulgarian Football Union banned Inkoom for one year following a legal notice from FIFA that he had caused damages to a real estate worth 65 316 USD while he was playing for D.C. United.

International career
Inkoom is a former member of the Black Satellites. He played with the team at 2009 African Youth Championship in Rwanda. The team emerged the winner at that tournament, he was part of the satellite side that beat Brazil in a penalty shoot out to annex the cup for Africa and Ghana for the first time in the under 20 tournament in 2009. Inkoom played his first game for the senior side, the Black Stars, on 20 November 2008 against Tunisia.

He received his first start for Ghana in the World Cup qualifier against Benin on 28 March, which Ghana won 1–0. Inkoom used to be a member of the Black Starlets. He was in the extended squad for the 2005 FIFA U-17 World Championship in Peru. He was part of Ghana's 2015 Africa Cup of Nations campaign, helping them reach the final, where they lost in a penalty shootout against the Ivory Coast.

Personal life
In April 2015, it was revealed that Inkoom was sued by the landlord of the property he rented in the United States whilst playing with D.C. United for destroying the property and not paying rent.

Honours
Asante Kotoko
 Ghana Premier League: 2007–08
 President's Cup: 2008
 SWAG Cup: 2008

Basel
 Swiss Super League: 2010
 Swiss Cup: 2010
Accra Hearts of Oak

 Ghanaian FA Cup: 2022

Ghana U-20
 African Youth Championship: 2009
 FIFA U-20 World Cup: 2009

Ghana
 Africa Cup of Nations Silver Medal: 2010, 2015

References

External links

 
 
 

1989 births
Living people
Association football fullbacks
Ghanaian footballers
Asante Kotoko S.C. players
FC Basel players
Sekondi Hasaacas F.C. players
FC Dnipro players
S.C. Adelaide players
SC Bastia players
D.C. United players
Boavista F.C. players
Antalyaspor footballers
FC Vereya players
FC Dunav Ruse players
FC Samtredia players
FC Torpedo Kutaisi players
Swiss Super League players
Ligue 1 players
Ukrainian Premier League players
Super League Greece players
Major League Soccer players
Primeira Liga players
Süper Lig players
First Professional Football League (Bulgaria) players
Erovnuli Liga players
Ghana under-20 international footballers
Ghana international footballers
2010 Africa Cup of Nations players
2012 Africa Cup of Nations players
Ghanaian expatriate footballers
Expatriate footballers in Switzerland
Expatriate footballers in Ukraine
Expatriate footballers in France
Expatriate footballers in Greece
Expatriate footballers in Turkey
Expatriate footballers in Portugal
Expatriate footballers in Bulgaria
Expatriate soccer players in the United States
Expatriate footballers in Georgia (country)
Ghanaian expatriate sportspeople in Switzerland
Ghanaian expatriate sportspeople in Ukraine
Ghanaian expatriate sportspeople in France
Ghanaian expatriate sportspeople in Greece
Ghanaian expatriate sportspeople in Turkey
Ghanaian expatriate sportspeople in Portugal
Ghanaian expatriate sportspeople in Bulgaria
Ghanaian expatriate sportspeople in the United States
Ghanaian expatriate sportspeople in Georgia (country)
2010 FIFA World Cup players
2014 FIFA World Cup players
Ghana A' international footballers